Elections to Manchester City Council were held on 5 May 2016. One third of the council was up for election, with each successful candidate serving a two-year term of office, expiring in 2018, due to planned boundary changes. The Labour Party retained overall control of the council, managing to hold all but one seat contested and won by former Withington MP, John Leech. Leech's win signified the first gain for any party in Manchester other than Labour for the first time in six years.

Result
Changes in vote share are compared to the 2015 election.

Council Composition
Prior to the election the composition of the council was:

After the election, the composition of the council was:

LD - Liberal Democrat

Ward results
Asterisks denote incumbent Councillors seeking re-election. Councillors seeking re-election were elected in 2012, and results are compared to that year's polls on that basis. All results are listed below:

Ancoats and Clayton

Ardwick

Baguley

Bradford

Brooklands

Burnage

Charlestown

Cheetham

Chorlton
Councillor Sheila Newman died suddenly 19 February 2018, three months prior to the 2018 local elections which she was due to stand in.

Chorlton Park

City Centre

Crumpsall

Didsbury East

Didsbury West

Leech's win signified the first gain for any party in Manchester other than Labour for the first time in six years and provided Manchester with its first opposition for two years.
Robert Gutenfreund-Walmsley stood in 2012 for the Democracy First party.

Fallowfield

Gorton North

Gorton South

Harpurhey

Higher Blackley

Hulme

Levenshulme

Longsight

Miles Platting and Newton Heath

Moss Side

Moston

Northenden

Old Moat

Rusholme

Sharston

Whalley Range

Withington

Woodhouse Park

Changes between 2016 and 2018

Rusholme by-election 4 May 2017
The resignation of Labour councillor Kate Chappell in March 2017 triggered a by-election for Rusholme ward on 4 May:

Fallowfield by-election 27 July 2017
The resignation of Labour councillor Mike Amesbury in June 2017 (he was elected Member of Parliament for Weaver Vale) triggered a by-election in Fallowfield on 27 July:

Changes that did not result in a by-election
Lady Mayoress and Labour councillor Shiela Newman (Chorlton) died suddenly on 18 February 2018. Her term would have ended in May.

Labour councillor Beth Knowles (City Centre) resigned from the council in March 2018. Her term would have ended in May.

References

2016 English local elections
2016
2010s in Manchester